The Newton Homestead is a historic octagon house located on Ridge Road in the South Otselic hamlet of the town of Otselic, Chenango County, New York. It was built about 1860 by Leroy and Courtland Newton, and is a two-story, rubble filled concrete building sheathed in stucco. It has a hipped roof topped by an octagonal wooden cupola. Today it is a private residence but was for years the Gladding International Sport Fishing Museum.

On June 3, 1982, it was added to the National Register of Historic Places.

References

Houses on the National Register of Historic Places in New York (state)
Houses completed in 1860
Octagon houses in New York (state)
Houses in Chenango County, New York
National Register of Historic Places in Chenango County, New York